Aamir Ali Malik, known as Aamir Ali, is an Indian actor and model.

Career and personal life
Ali's first commercial break was a commercial for Bajaj Scooters. He appeared in advertising campaigns for Bajaj Bravo Scooter, Aptech Computers, Maruti Zen, Ponds talc, Nescafe, Mahindra Rodeo, Chevrolet, BSNL, Videocon D2H, State Bank of India and others. He played cameo roles in the movies I Hate Luv Storys, Raakh, Anjaan, and Yeh Kya Ho Raha Hai and appeared in music videos for Anuradha Paudwal - Ishq Hua and Mangal Singh  - Koka Koka.

Ali appeared in Kahaani Ghar Ghar Kii playing the role Sameer Kaul. Later he joined channel Sahara One's Woh Rehne Waali Mehlon Ki to play the role of Saumya Parashar. He played a lead in Kya Dill Mein Hai. He participated in Nach Baliye 3 with Sanjeeda Sheikh and on 22 December 2007 their pair won the Nach Baliye 3 championship against Rakhi Sawant and Abhishek Avasthi. Ali did a cameo in Sony TV's Kuchh Is Tara. He also worked in Bhaskar Bharti where he played the lead role Armaan which premiered on 25 May 2009 and concluded on 17 December 2009. He was also seen in Zara Nachke Dikha 2 from 1 May to 10 July 2010. In F.I.R., he played the character of Inspector Bajrang Pandey. He played the role of Saumya Chauhan in Sahara One's Jhilmil Sitaaron Ka Aangan Hoga, ended in October 2013. He was later seen in a cameo as Neil in the thriller series Ek Hasina Thi. He played the role of Dylan Singh Shekhawat in Dilli Wali Thakur Gurls, a show which aired on the And TV from March 2015 to October 2015. He also participated in Sony TV's reality show Power Couple with wife Sanjeeda Sheikh and later appeared in the show Sarojini as Rishabh on Zee TV.

He was married to television actress Sanjeeda Sheikh, they are divorced in 2021.

Ali appeared in music video 'Tanha Hoon' sung by Yasser Desai.

Filmography

Films

Television

References

External links

Indian male television actors
Indian television presenters
Living people
Male actors from Mumbai
Nach Baliye winners
Year of birth missing (living people)